= Center for Environmental Science and Policy =

American organization

Stanford Woods Institute for the Environment
- Type: Research center
- Chair of the Advisory Council: Ward W. Woods
- Website: woods.stanford.edu

The Ward W. and Priscilla B. Woods Institute for the Environment, previously known as the Center for Environmental Science and Policy (CESP), is a research center at the Freeman Spogli Institute for International Studies at Stanford University in Stanford, California. Its stated mission is to "produce breakthrough environmental solutions that protect and nurture our planet to meet the vital needs of people today and of generations to come."
